Puzeh-ye Hezar Qadami (also Romanized as Pūzeh-ye Hezār Qadamī) is a village in Mobarakabad Rural District, in the Central District of Qir and Karzin County, Fars Province, Iran. At the 2006 census, its population was 217, in 42 families.

References 

Populated places in Qir and Karzin County